Marcie Rendon (born 1952) is a Native American playwright, poet, author, and community arts activist based in Minneapolis. She is an enrolled member of the White Earth Band of the Minnesota Chippewa Tribe. 

Rendon founded Raving Native Productions theater. Along with various plays, screenplays, poems and short stories, she has written two nonfiction books for children, and three crime fiction novels. Her first novel Murder on the Red River won the 2018 Pinckley Prize for Debut Crime Fiction. Her second novel Girl Gone Missing was shortlisted for an Edgar award in January 2020 (The G.P. Putnam's Sons Sue Grafton Memorial Award) Her most successful theatre work to date is "Free Frybread Telethon", a play which satirizes the American prison system and its treatment of Native Americans.

Education 
Rendon graduated with a BA in Criminal Justice and a BA in Indian Studies from Moorhead State University in 1975. In 1991 she graduated with a MA in Human Development from Saint Mary's University of Minnesota of Winona in Minneapolis.

Career 
Rendon applied to the Loft Inroads program where she met Anishinabe writer Jim Northrup who became her mentor. She founded Raving Native Productions in 1996. Rendon was chosen as the first Native American woman to receive the McKnight Foundation's 2020 Distinguished Artist Award. In June 2019, Rendon was featured in the Visual Collaborative Polaris catalogue, under the Voyager series for humanities, she was interviewed alongside 25 people from around the world such as; Seun Kuti, Berla Mundi and Aya Chebbi.

Awards and honors 
 2018: Pinckley Prize for Debut Crime Fiction (Murder on the Red River)
 2002: Ohio Farm Bureau Federation Award (Farmer's Market)
 2002: WLA Children's Book Award (Farmer's Market)
 1997: Nomination for Notable Children's Trade Book in the Field of Social Sciences (Pow Wow Summer)
 2020: McKnight Foundation's Distinguished Artist Award
 2020: Honorary Doctor of Humane Letters from Adler University

Works

Children's nonfiction 
 Powwow Summer: A family celebrates the circle of life (1996, Carolrhoda Books)
 Farmer's market : families working together (2001, Carolrhoda Books)

Crime fiction 
 Murder on the Red River (2017, Cinco Puntos Press, republished by Soho Press in 2022)
 Girl Gone Missing (2019, Cinco Puntos Press, republished by Soho Press in 2022)
 Sinister Graves (October 2022, Soho Press)

References 

1952 births
Living people
American women non-fiction writers
American women novelists
Native American women writers
Ojibwe people
21st-century American non-fiction writers
21st-century American novelists
21st-century American women writers
20th-century Native American women
20th-century Native Americans
21st-century Native American women
21st-century Native Americans